MI6: Fifty Years of Special Operations is a book by author Stephen Dorril. The book alleges that MI6 has functioned as the backstair interventionist instrument of British foreign policy. The author tells of disruptive actions by secret services like successful coups such as the overthrow of the moderate Iranian leader, Mohammed Mossadeq, who was hated by the British because he had nationalized Iran's oil industry, attempted assassinations in Libya and Egypt, forging Swiss bank account documents in East Germany, and psychological warfare such as planting of false information, secret funding of propaganda and smearing opponents.

It has been criticized for its accuracy and use of material. Dorril claimed Nelson Mandela was recruited by MI6, promoting Mandela to "angrily" react in denying it, the South African government also denying it and leading British officials to criticize the book. Dorril responded to the criticism, writing: "there is nothing implausible in the idea that someone such as Nelson Mandela might have been recruited." Christopher Andrew reviewed the book for The Times, explaining: "It does not seem to occur to Mr Dorril that his failure to evaluate the reliability of this story does more serious damage to the credibility or his book than to Mandela's reputation." As for the content Andrews wrote: "The first 31 chapters of his 900-page book rarely go beyond the mid-1960s: the story of the next 35 years by contrast is compressed into only five chapters. Mr Dorril's interpretation is equally lop-sided."

References

External links
 Review by David Skea
 Mark Hollingsworth on Stephen Dorril's revealing history of MI6

2000 non-fiction books
British non-fiction books
Works about the Secret Intelligence Service
Books about intelligence agencies